Vladimir Vladimirovich But (born 7 September 1977) is a Russian former professional footballer who played as a midfielder. He works as director of sports for FC Chernomorets Novorossiysk.

Career
Once regarded as one of the most promising players in Europe, But signed in 1994, at not yet 17, with German side Borussia Dortmund, from local FC Chernomorets Novorossiysk, but spent his first years with the juniors.

On 21 August 1996, he finally made his first team debut, appearing in ten minutes of a 4–0 home league win against Fortuna Düsseldorf. But finished his first season with 11 matches and one goal, and added two games (three minutes total) in the club's victorious UEFA Champions League campaign, becoming the second Russian player to win the competition after Igor Dobrovolski.

In late October 2000, But left Borussia after falling out with coach Matthias Sammer, and joined  SC Freiburg where he stayed for the next three seasons, appearing regularly (but also being relegated at the end of the 2001–02 campaign). In January 2004, he stayed in the country as he signed with Hannover 96, but could only collect four league appearances in one and a half years.

But returned to his country in July 2005, and signed for FC Shinnik Yaroslavl. After two years out of the game due to recurrent injuries, the 30-year-old re-joined hometown side Chernomorets, in the second division.

In June 2009, But signed with Greece's OFI Crete as a free agent, but retired from football after one unassuming season. He collected two caps for Russia whilst at Borussia.

Personal life
But's older brother, Vitali, was also a footballer – and a midfielder. He too represented Chernomorets Novorossiysk, later acting as its general manager.

Career statistics

Honours
Chernomorets Novorossiysk
Russian National Football League: 1994

Borussia Dortmund
Bundesliga: 1995–96
DFB-Supercup: 1996
UEFA Champions League: 1996–97
Intercontinental Cup: 1997

SC Freiburg
2. Bundesliga: 2002–03

References

External links
RussiaTeam biography and profile 
LegionerKulichi profile 

1977 births
Living people
People from Novorossiysk
Russian footballers
Association football midfielders
Russia youth international footballers
Russia under-21 international footballers
Russia international footballers
Russian Premier League players
FC Chernomorets Novorossiysk players
FC Shinnik Yaroslavl players
UEFA Champions League winning players
Bundesliga players
2. Bundesliga players
Borussia Dortmund players
Borussia Dortmund II players
SC Freiburg players
Hannover 96 players
Football League (Greece) players
OFI Crete F.C. players
Russian expatriate footballers
Expatriate footballers in Germany
Expatriate footballers in Greece
Russian expatriate sportspeople in Germany
Russian expatriate sportspeople in Greece
Sportspeople from Krasnodar Krai